Jonathan Freeman-Attwood, CBE is the 14th Principal of the Royal Academy of Music in London; he was appointed in 2008. Alongside his commitment to education, he is a writer, recording producer, broadcaster and trumpet player.

In 2001, he was conferred as professor with a personal chair from the University of London, and in 2009 was appointed a Fellow of King's College London, (where he is a Visiting Professor); he was a Trustee of the University of London from 2010 to 2015, appointed Fellow of the Royal Northern College of Music in 2013, and in 2017 was made a Fellow of the Royal College of Music. He is a Trustee and Chair of the Artistic Advisory Committee of Garsington Opera, a Trustee of the Young Classical Artists' Trust (YCAT), the Associated Board of the Royal Schools of Music (ABRSM) and the Countess of Munster Musical Trust. He is a Council member of the Advisory Board of the Academy of Ancient Music, Vice-President of the National Youth Wind Orchestra of Great Britain, Founding Patron of London Youth Choirs, a Trustee of Christ Church Cathedral Oxford Music, the Imogen Cooper Music Trust, and the British Library SAGA Trust. In 2018 he was granted the title of Honorary Visiting Professor of Tokyo University of the Arts (Tokyo Geidai).

He was appointed a CBE (Commander of the Most Excellent Order of the British Empire) on 30 December 2017 for Services to Music.

Early life and education
Freeman-Attwood was born in Woking, Surrey, on 4 November 1961, the son of Major Harold Warren Freeman-Attwood and Marigold Diana Sneyd Freeman-Attwood (née Philips).

He attended first St Peter's School, Seaford, and from 1975 to 1980 Milton Abbey School. He read for a BMus (Hons) in Music at the University of Toronto, where he was awarded the Healey Willan Scholarship, and graduated with First Class Honours before embarking on research at Christ Church, Oxford (MPhil).

Career
He served for thirteen years as Vice-Principal and Director of Studies at the Royal Academy of Music under his predecessor, Sir Curtis Price, after a period as Dean of Undergraduate Studies between 1991 and 1995, when he was responsible for launching the first Bachelor of Music performance degree in the sector, with King's College London, and under the aegis of the Centre for Advanced Performance Studies (CAPS).

For over a quarter of a century in senior posts at the Academy, Freeman-Attwood has played a leading role in launching pioneering programmes, major international relationships – nurturing a twenty-year collaboration with the Academy's sister conservatoire in the US, The Juilliard School – as well as several professional development initiatives, including the founding in 1997 of the Academy recording label (now with forty titles to its name, including a major association with Linn Records from 2012) to introduce talented young artists to the creative challenges of the studio. He has also assembled a roster of eminent international musicians as permanent staff or visiting professors. Under his leadership the Royal Academy of Music consistently leads international league-tables for university ranking.

A close involvement in the artistic strategy of the Academy has led to the inauguration of successful community-concert series, amongst others 'Free on Fridays', '400+' and, with the Kohn Foundation, a 10-year project to perform all of Bach's sacred and secular cantatas, which extended into a new series of Bach the European: from Ancient Cosmos to Enlightenment. Under his Principalship, the Academy has gained Degree-Awarding Powers from the Privy Council (2012), and has recently embarked on a number of transformational capital projects, including two new practice facilities and, from 2015, a major theatre and recital hall project, the Susie Sainsbury Theatre and Angela Burgess Recital Hall, which was completed in early 2018.

Personal

In 1990, Freeman-Attwood married Henrietta Paula Christian Parham; they have two children.

Recordings
Jonathan Freeman-Attwood has produced well over 250 commercial discs for many of the world's most prestigious independent labels including Naxos, BIS, Chandos, Hyperion, Harmonia Mundi USA, Channel Classics, Pentatone, and AVIE. His productions have won major awards, including several Diapasons d’Or, eight Gramophone awards and numerous nominations over the last twenty years with artists such as Rachel Podger, The Cardinall's Musick, Trevor Pinnock, Oliver Knussen, Phantasm, I Fagiolini, La Nuova Musica, the Orchestra of the Age of Enlightenment and Daniel-Ben Pienaar, and various leading cathedral choirs, including St Paul's Cathedral and Christ Church Cathedral, Oxford. He produced Gramophones ‘Record of the Year’ in 2010 – the final volume of William Byrd's complete Latin Church Music for Hyperion.

As a trumpet soloist, Freeman-Attwood has released twelve solo albums, the majority with Linn Records, and has attracted wide critical acclaim for their musical originality and effective 're-imagining' of the trumpet as a chamber instrument in reconstructions of works from c.1600 to the 20th Century. Initially with John Wallace and Colm Carey in 2003 he recorded The Trumpets that Time Forgot (Rheinberger and Elgar) before conceiving a series of programmes with pianist Daniel-Ben Pienaar: La Trompette Retrouvée (2007), Trumpet Masque (2008), Romantic Trumpet Sonatas (2010), A Bach Notebook for Trumpet (2012) and The Neoclassical Trumpet (2014), An English Sett for Trumpet (2017). Trumpet Masque won High Fidelity's Recording of the Year in 2009.

He also recorded the world première of Gabriel Fauré's Vocalises in 2013, accompanied by pianist-scholar Roy Howat whose edition was published by Peters. Freeman-Attwood acts as Series Editor for Resonata Music, including ‘The Re-Imagined Trumpet’ in which, amongst other pieces from his catalogue, newly configured sonatas by Schumann, Mendelssohn and Fauré have been published. In 2014 he recorded the Godfather Theme for Sony as part of the anniversary celebrations of the classic films. In 2020, he published with composer Thomas Oehler a Sonata ‘after Richard Strauss’ for Boosey and Hawkes, recorded for Linn, with Chiyan Wong as part of The Viennese Trumpet. This follows an edition of Stravinsky's Pulcinella Suite with collaborator Daniel-Ben Pienaar.

Writing
As educator and scholar he continues to be active as a lecturer, critic, and contributor to journals  (Gramophone since 1992) and books, including The New Grove Dictionary of Music and Musicians (2nd edition, 2001), Cambridge University Press's Companion of Recorded Music (2009), and to BBC Radio 3, for which he is a regular contributor to Building a Library. He is an established authority on Bach interpretation, particularly as it challenges and refocuses historical perspectives on performance practices, and writes essays regularly for EMI, Warner, Deutsche Grammophon, Universal, and other major record labels.

In 2021 he co-edited a volume, Musical Architects, to celebrate the new spaces designed by Ian Ritchie Architects at the Royal Academy of Music, and also the Academy's Bicentenary in 2022.

References

Academics of the Royal Academy of Music
Principals of the Royal Academy of Music
Alumni of Christ Church, Oxford
Commanders of the Order of the British Empire
Honorary Members of the Royal Academy of Music
People educated at Milton Abbey School
Fellows of King's College London
Living people
Year of birth missing (living people)